In the grammar of Ancient Greek, including Koine, the aorist (pronounced  or ) is a class of verb forms that generally portray a situation as simple or undefined, that is, as having aorist aspect.  In the grammatical terminology of classical Greek, it is a tense, one of the seven divisions of the conjugation of a verb, found in all moods and voices.

Terminology
In traditional grammatical terminology, the aorist is a "tense", a section of the verb paradigm formed with the same stem across all moods. By contrast, in theoretical linguistics, tense refers to a form that specifies a point in time (past, present, or future), so in that sense the aorist is a tense-aspect combination.

The literary Greek of Athens in the fifth and fourth centuries BC, Attic Greek, was the standard school-room form of Greek for centuries. This article therefore  describes chiefly the Attic aorist but also the variants at other times and in other dialects as needed. The poems of Homer were studied in Athens and may have been compiled there. They are in Epic or Homeric Greek, an artificial blend of several dialects, not including Attic. The Homeric aorist differs in morphology from Attic, but educated Athenians imitated Homeric syntax.

Conversely, Hellenistic or Koine Greek was a blend of several dialects after the conquests of Alexander. Most of the written texts that survive in Koine imitate the Attic taught in schools to a greater or lesser extent, but the spoken language of the writers appears to have simplified and regularized the formation of the aorist, and some of the features of Attic syntax are much less frequently attested.

Morphology
A verb may have either a first aorist or a second aorist: the distinction is like that between weak (try, tried) and strong verbs (write, wrote) in English.

First

Compensatory lengthening

In Aeolic Greek (which contributes some forms to Homeric), the  causes compensatory lengthening of the sonorant instead of the vowel, producing a double consonant ( → ,  → ).

The present stem sometimes undergoes sound changes caused by a suffix — for instance,  (IPA: , English consonantal y). In this case, the aorist is formed from the verbal root without the present-stem sound changes.

Kiparsky analyzes the process as debuccalization of s to h in Proto-Greek, metathesis of h and the sonorant so that h comes before the sonorant, and assimilation of h to the vowel (Attic-Ionic-Doric) or to the consonant (Aeolic).
 men-sa → men-ha (debuccalization) → mehna (metathesis) → mēna or menna (compensatory lengthening)

First aorist endings
The first person singular indicative active, second person singular imperfect middle, the second person singular imperatives, infinitive active, and masculine nominative singular of the participle (bolded), however, do not follow this pattern. The subjunctive active and middle have endings identical to the present active and mediopassive, while the passive has endings identical to the present active.

Most of the passive forms of the first aorist have endings similar to those of the root aorist.

Second
The stem of the second aorist is the bare root of the verb, or a reduplicated version of the root. In these verbs, the present stem often has e-grade of ablaut and adds a nasal infix or suffix to the basic verb root, but the aorist has zero-grade (no e) and no infix or suffix.

Zero-grade
When the present has a diphthong (e.g.), the second aorist has the offglide of the diphthong.
 present  "leave", aorist  (e-grade in present, zero-grade in aorist)

 present  "fly", aorist  (e-grade in present, zero-grade in aorist)
 present , aorist  (e-grade  in present, zero-grade  →  in aorist)

Reduplication
Present stems of verbs with a reduplicated aorist often do not have e-grade or an infix or suffix.
 present  "lead", aorist  (bare stem in present, reduplicated stem in aorist)

Second aorist endings
In the indicative, endings are identical to those of the imperfect; in non-indicative moods, they are identical to those of the present.

Second aorist passive
A few verbs have passive aorists in both forms, usually with no distinction in meaning; but  "I appeared" is distinguished from  "I was shown".

There is no correlation between the first/second aorist distinction in the active and the passive: a verb with an active second aorist may have a passive first aorist or vice versa.

Root
The root aorist is characteristic of athematic verbs (those with a present active in ). Like the second aorist, the stem is the bare root, and endings are similar to the imperfect in the indicative, and identical to the present in non-indicative moods. It is sometimes included as a subcategory of the second aorist because of these similarities, but unlike the second aorist of thematic verbs, it has no thematic .

The singular aorist indicative active of some athematic verbs uses a stem formed by the suffix  and takes first aorist rather than root aorist endings.

Syntax
The aorist generally presents a situation as an undivided whole, also known as the perfective aspect.

Aspectual variations
The aorist has a number of variations in meaning that appear in all moods.

Ingressive
In verbs denoting a state or continuing action, the aorist may express the beginning of the action or the entrance into the state.  This is called ingressive aorist (also inceptive or inchoative).
  "I am king" (present) —  "I became king" or "I ruled" (aorist)
 basileúō — ebasíleusa

Resultative
The resultative aorist expresses the result of an action. Whether this is truly distinguishable from the normal force of the narrative aorist is disputable. 
  "I was deliberating" is imperfect;  "I decided" is aorist.

Indicative mood
The aorist usually implies a past event in the indicative, but it does not assert pastness, and can be used of present or future events. 
 
 I am undone if you will leave me, wife.

Narrative
The aorist and the imperfect are the standard tenses for telling a story. The ordinary distinction between them is between an action considered as a single undivided event and the action as a continuous event. Thus, for example, a process as a whole can be described in the imperfect, while the individual steps in that process will be aorist.
 [Cyrus] was playing in this village... in the road with others of his age. The boys while playing chose to be their king this one....  Then he assigned some of them to the building of houses, some to be his bodyguard, one doubtless to be the King's Eye; to another he gave the right of bringing him messages;....
 
Here the imperfect  "was playing" is the whole process of the game (which continues past these extracts); the aorists the individual steps.

The narrative aorist has the same force, of an undivided or single action, when used by itself:
 And when the men who in former days were wont to do him homage saw him, they made their obeisance even then, although they knew that he was being led forth to death.
 
 Were wont to do him homage is the imperfect, made their obeisance the aorist, of  "kowtow".

Complexive
On the other hand, if the entire action is expressed, not as a continuous action, but as a single undivided event, the aorist is used:

Herodotus introduces his story of Cyrus playing with:
 Now when the boy was ten years old, the truth about him was revealed in some such way as this:
 

The aorist is also used when something is described as happening for some definite interval of time; this particular function can be more precisely called the temporal aorist: 
 My father Cephalus was persuaded by Pericles to come to this land and lived (there) thirty years.
 Lysias, Against Eratosthenes 4

Past-in-the-past
The other chief narrative use of the aorist is to express events before the time of the story:
 they persuaded the Himeraeans to join in the war, and not only to go with them themselves but to provide arms for the seamen from their vessels (for they had beached their ships at Himera)
 

It thus often translates an English or Latin pluperfect: the Greek  pluperfect has the narrower function of expressing a state of affairs existing at the time of the story as the result of events before the time of the story.

Gnomic
The gnomic aorist expresses the way things generally happen, as in proverbs. The empiric aorist states a fact of experience ( empeiríā), and is modified by the adverbs often, always, sometimes, already, not yet, never, etc. (English tends to express similar timeless assertions with the simple present.) 

The gnomic aorist is regarded as a primary tense in determining the mood of verbs in subordinate clauses. That is to say, subordinate clauses take the subjunctive instead of the optative.
  (not )Tyrants make rich in a moment whomever they wish.

Dramatic
In dialogues within tragedy and comedy, the first person singular aorist or present expresses an action performed by the act of speaking, like thanking someone (see performative utterance), or, according to another analysis, a state of mind. This is called tragic or dramatic aorist. The aorist is used when the action is complete in the single statement; the present when the speaker goes on to explain how or why he is acting.
 Sausage-seller. I like your threats, laugh at your empty bluster,dance a fling, and cry cuckoo all around.
 : translated by William James Hickie

Indicative mood with particle

Unattainable wish
A wish about the past that cannot be fulfilled is expressed by the aorist indicative with the particles  or  "if only" (eíthe, ei gár). This is called the aorist of unattainable wish.
 If only I had been with you then, Pericles!
 

An unattainable wish about the present uses the imperfect. A wish about the future uses the optative with or without a particle; an optative of wish may be unattainable.

Past potential
The aorist indicative (less commonly the imperfect) with the modal particle  (án), Homeric  (ké[n]), may express past potentiality, probability, or necessity.
 For who would have expected these things to happen?

Iterative
The aorist indicative (also the imperfect, or past iterative in Herodotus) with  án may express repeated or customary past action. This is called the iterative indicative. It is similar to the past potential, since it denotes what could have happened at a given point, but unlike the past potential, it is a statement of fact.
 
 But whenever he came past any of those who had fought under him before, he would say
 Xenophon, Cyropaedia, 7.1.14

Unreal
The aorist or imperfect indicative with  may express past unreality or counterfactuality. This is called the unreal indicative. This construction is used in the consequence of past counterfactual conditional sentences.

Participles
Outside of indirect discourse, an aorist participle may express any time (past, present, or rarely future) relative to the main verb.

Non-indicative moods
Outside of the indicative mood, sometimes the aorist determines time (often past time), and sometimes the function of the mood determines it. When the aorist does not determine time, it determines aspect instead.

Aorist in indirect discourse refers to past time relative to the main verb, since it replaces an aorist indicative.

An imperative, subjunctive or optative in an independent clause usually refers to future time, because the imperative express a command, the subjunctive expresses urging, prohibition, or deliberation, and the optative expresses a wish or possibility.

In dependent clauses (temporal, conditional, etc.), the time (past, present, or future) of an aorist subjunctive, optative, or imperative is based on the function of the mood. The subjunctive is used with main verbs in the present and future tenses (primary sequence), and the optative is used with main verbs in the past tenses (secondary sequence) and to express potentiality in the future.

Optative mood

Potential
In the potential optative, the aorist expresses aspect, and the potential optative implies future time.

See also
 Aorist
 Perfective aspect

Notes

Bibliography
 Albert Rijksbaron, Syntax and Semantics of the Verb in Classical Greek: An Introduction (2002).
 Herbert Weir Smyth,  A Greek grammar for colleges (1916).

Grammatical tenses
Grammatical aspects
Ancient Greek
Greek grammar